Professor Yao Xinzhong (born 1957) is Dean of the School of Philosophy at Renmin University of China in Beijing, as well as author and editor of the Encyclopaedia of Confucianism. He was formerly director of the King's China Institute at King's College London. Prior to this appointment, Professor Yao was Professor of Religion and Ethics at the University of Wales, Lampeter, and a senior research fellow at the Ian Ramsey Centre, University of Oxford. He was educated at Renmin University, and took his Doctorate Degree at  University of Wales.

Professor Yao has written books and articles on the subject of Confucianism, including comparative studies with Christianity. In 1998, in recognition of his work promoting Confucianism in the UK, he was made honorary President of the Confucian Academy in Hong Kong.

Bibliography

References

External links
 Ian Ramsey Centre: Xinzhong Yao
 King's College London: Professor Xinzhong Yao

Religion academics
Living people
Chinese Confucianists
Academics of King's College London
Renmin University of China alumni
Alumni of the University of Wales
1957 births